A nuclear-powered icebreaker is an icebreaker with an onboard nuclear power plant that produces power for the vessel's propulsion system. , Russia is the only country that builds and operates nuclear-powered icebreakers, having built a number of such vessels to aid shipping along the Northern Sea Route since the Soviet times. Nuclear-powered icebreakers are much more powerful than their diesel-powered counterparts. Although nuclear propulsion is expensive to install and maintain, very heavy fuel demands, limitations on range, and difficulty refueling in the Arctic region can make diesel vessels less practical and less economical overall for these ice-breaking duties.

Uses of nuclear-powered icebreakers 

Russian s are used to force through the ice for the benefit of cargo ships and other vessels along the Northern Sea Route, which comprises the eastern part of the Barents Sea, the Pechora Sea, the Kara Sea, the Laptev Sea, and the Eastern Siberian Sea to the Bering Strait. Other important ports include Dikson, Tiksi, and Pevek. Of six Arktika-class icebreakers built in 1975–2007, two are currently in service.

Two shallow-draft nuclear-powered icebreakers, Vaygach and Taymyr, have been built for shallow waters and are usually used from the Yenisei River to Dikson, where they break through the ice followed by cargo ships with lumber from Igarka and cargo ships with ore and metals from the Norilsk Company's port in Dudinka.

The icebreakers have also been used for a number of scientific expeditions in the Arctic. On August 17, 1977,  was the first surface vessel in the world to reach the North Pole. Since 1989, some icebreakers have been used for Arctic tourist cruises.

Russian nuclear icebreakers 

, twelve civilian nuclear-powered vessels have entered service in the USSR and Russia. Eleven of these are icebreakers, and one is a cargo ship with an icebreaking bow. All six nuclear-powered icebreakers of the Arktika class have been built at the Baltic Shipyard in St. Petersburg. Vaygach and Taymyr were built at the Helsinki New Shipyard in Finland and then brought to Russia for installation of the reactors and turbogenerators.

In addition to icebreakers, the Soviet Union built a nuclear-powered ice-strengthened cargo ship Sevmorput.

Classes

Vessels

Ships

Lenin 
At its launch in 1957, Lenin was both the world's first nuclear-powered surface ship and the first nuclear-powered civilian vessel. Lenin was put into ordinary operation in 1959. Lenin had two nuclear accidents, the first in 1965, and the second in 1967. The second accident resulted in one of the three OK-150 reactors being damaged beyond repair. All three reactors were removed, and replaced by two OK-900 reactors; the ship returned to service in 1970. Lenin was taken out of operation in November 1989 and laid up at Atomflot, the base for nuclear-powered icebreakers, in the Murmansk Fjord. Conversion to a museum ship was scheduled to be completed .

Arktika class 

Arktika class icebreakers, also known as Project 10520 nuclear-powered icebreakers, are the bulk of the Russian nuclear icebreaker fleet; six of Russia's ten nuclear civilian ships are Arktikas. Since they have been built over a period of thirty years, ships of different classes vary among one another; thus specifications are listed as a range of values. In general, the newer ships are larger, faster, and require smaller crews. The first four of the class are retired, with two remaining in service .

Specifications:
Length: 148 m to 159 m (approximately 136 m at the waterline)
Beam: 30 m (28 m at the waterline)
Draft: approximately 11.08 m.
Height (keel to masthead): approximately 55 m
Displacement: 23,000 to 25,000 tons
Maximum speed: 18 to 22 knots
Cruising speed: approximately 18 to 20 knots
Crew: 138 to over 200
Passengers: approximately 100
Reactors: 2 OK-900A, 171 megawatt each
Propulsion: 3 propellers totaling approximately 75,000 hp
Maximum ice thickness: 2 to 2.8 m
Endurance: 7.5 months at sea, 4 years between refuelings

Arktika-class icebreakers have a double hull, with the outer hull being approximately 48mm thick at the ice-breaking areas and 25mm thick elsewhere. There is water ballast between the inner and outer hulls which can be shifted to aid ice-breaking. Ice-breaking is also assisted by an air bubbling system which can deliver 24 m3/s of air from jets 9 m below the surface. Some ships have polymer coated hulls to reduce friction. Arktika-class ships can break ice while making way either forwards or backwards. Although they have two reactors, normally only one is used to provide power, with the other being maintained in a standby mode.

Some ships carry one or two helicopters and several Zodiac boats. Radio and satellite systems can include navigation, telephone, fax, and email capabilities.

Most nuclear-powered icebreakers in the Russian service today have a swimming pool, a sauna, a cinema, and a gymnasium. In the restaurants aboard there is a bar and facilities for live music performances. Some also
have a library and at least one has a volleyball court.

Individual ships
On 17 August 1977, Arktika ("Arctic") became the first surface ship ever to reach the North Pole. Arktika was withdrawn from service in 2008 after clocking up 175,000 hours of reactor operation time and covering more than 1 million nautical miles. Rather than be scrapped, there are calls for her to be converted to a museum ship, like her predecessor Lenin.

Sibir ("Siberia") ceased operation in 1992 and is awaiting scrapping.

Rossiya ("Russia") carries two helicopters. Rossiya was used to transport an expedition of around 40 West Germans to the North Pole in the Summer of 1990; this may have been the first non-communist charter of a nuclear icebreaker.Rossiya was in refit as of December 2004.

Sovetskiy Soyuz ("Soviet Union") was trapped in ice for three days in 1998. In 2004, it was one of three icebreakers used for an Arctic ice core expedition intended to research climate change and global warming.

Yamal is mostly used for tourism and scientific expeditions. It has 50 passenger cabins and suites, and carries one helicopter. The crew is 150, including 50 officers and engineers. Yamal was the 12th surface ship ever to reach the North Pole.

50 Let Pobedy ("50 Years of Victory") is the final Arktika class ship. It was launched from the shipyard at Saint Petersburg on December 29, 1993, as Ural, and delivered to Murmansk in 1994. It was later renamed and not actually completed and commissioned until 2006 due to funding delays. The crew is expected to normally number 138 persons. It has an environmental waste processing module added to the hull which accounts for 9 m of the ship's 159 m length; this makes it the largest of the Arktika class and the largest nuclear-powered icebreaker in the world. It carries two Ka-32 helicopters. It entered service on April 2, 2007.

Taymyr class
Taymyr and her sister ship, Vaygach, were built at the Helsinki New Shipyard in Finland by Wärtsilä. The nuclear reactors were installed at the Leningrad Baltic Shipyard in the Soviet Union after delivery from Finland.

Specifications:
Length: 150.2 m (Taymyr), 151.8 m (Vaygach)
Beam: 29.2 m
Draft: 8.0 m
Height: 15.2 m keel to main deck, 8 stories from main deck to bridge
Displacement: 20,000 tons
Speed: 18.5 knots
Crew: 120 to 138
Reactors: One KLT-40M reactor producing 135 MW
Propulsion: 3 propellers totalling 52,000 hp

The bow hull plating is approximately 32 mm thick.

Project 22220

Russia started building new icebreakers, Project 22220, in 2013. According to the BBC the LK-60 (ЛК60Я) will be the biggest nuclear-powered icebreaker that was ever built. Sergei Kiriyenko, head of the state nuclear corporation Rosatom ordered the responsible operator Atomflot to build up to three nuclear icebreakers until 2016. The construction of a nuclear-powered icebreaker takes eight years, the fuel endurance is about 25 years and the reactor can be refueled. According to the Transport Ministry, Russia needs six new icebreakers in the future. In October 2020, the first Project 22220 icebreaker, a new vessel named Arktika, completed sea trials and began operations in Arctic waters. The second (Sibir) began sea trials in November 2021.

Infrastructure
Support facilities include the fuel transports Imandra and Lotta which are used for refuelling and spent fuel. Volodarsky is used for storage of solid waste; it can hold 300 cubic meters. Serebryanka is a tanker used for liquid waste which can hold 1,000 cubic meters of material. Rosta-1 boat is used for radiation monitoring and control, including sanitization of workers.

A third fuel vessel, is filled with spent nuclear fuel elements, many of them damaged and thus difficult to handle. The vessel was used for dumping of nuclear waste in the Barents and Kara Seas from 1963 to 1984. During a dumping operation in 1984, Lepse encountered very rough seas, and high-level reactor waste mixed with water was splashed all over the inside of the cargo compartment. The contamination was so severe that the crew were forced to immediately return to port at the Atomflot harbor with most of the nuclear waste still in the hold. The ship was immediately recognized as being far too dangerous to decontaminate and return to service, and has been essentially abandoned with a cargo hold full of leaking spent reactor fuel vessels, staying in the harbor for over 15 years. A small crew monitored the ship on a constant basis while Russia tried to raise the money and perform the research needed for safe disposal. In September 2012 Lepse was removed from the Atomflot harbor and transported to the Nerpa shipyard where it will be carefully scrapped.
In October 2020, the last container with spent nuclear fuel was removed from Lepse.

In all, about 2,000 people work aboard the icebreakers, the nuclear-powered container ship, and aboard the service and storage ships stationed at the Atomflot harbour. The crew on the civil nuclear-powered vessels receive special training at the Makarov college in St. Petersburg, Russia.

Icebreakers generally try to navigate paths with the least possible ice in order to make speedier progress and to help ensure that they do not become trapped in ice too thick for them to break. In the 1970s and 1980s, land-based aircraft would observe and map the ice to help with course plotting. Over time, most of this work has been taken over by satellite surveillance systems, sometimes aided by the helicopters carried by the icebreakers.

Arctic tourism

Since 1989 the nuclear-powered icebreakers have also been used for tourist purposes carrying passengers to the North Pole. Each participant pays up to US$25,000 for a cruise lasting three weeks. Sibir was used for the first two tourist cruises in 1989 and 1990. In 1991 and 1992, the tourist trips to the North Pole were undertaken by Sovetskiy Soyuz. During the summer of 1993 Yamal was used for three tourist expeditions in the Arctic. Yamal has a separate accommodation section for tourists. The nuclear-powered icebreaker 50 Let Pobedy contains an accommodation deck customized for tourists.

Quark Expeditions chartered 50 Let Pobedy for expeditions to the North Pole in 2008. The vessel's maiden voyage to the North Pole embarked in Murmansk, on June 24, 2008. The ship carried 128 guests in 64 cabins in five categories. 50 Let Pobedy completed a total of three expeditions to the North Pole in 2008 for the polar adventure company. As of February 2013, Quark Expeditions was listing 50 Let Pobedy in the company fleet and offering it for a North Pole cruise.

See also

References

External links

Gallery of Russian nuclear icebreakers
The Nuclear icebreaker fleet - on Rosatom official site 
Pravda: Russia Builds World's Biggest Nuclear Icebreaker
Technical information, MSCO
Presentation on Safety of Current Russian Nuclear Facilities
Nordic Nuclear Safety Icebreakers page
NTI Icebreaker page, also Service Ship Table and Atomflot page

Ship types
Icebreakers
 
Russian inventions
Transport in the Arctic